A gemma (plural gemmae) is a single cell, or a mass of cells, or a modified bud of tissue, that detaches from the parent and develops into a new individual. This type of asexual reproduction is referred to as fragmentation. It is a means of asexual propagation in plants. These structures are  commonly found in fungi, algae, liverworts and mosses, but also in some flowering plants such as pygmy sundews and some species of butterworts. Vascular plants have many other methods of asexual reproduction including bulbils and turions.

In mosses and liverworts 

The production of gemmae is a widespread means of asexual reproduction in both liverworts and mosses. In liverworts such as Marchantia, the flattened plant body or thallus is a haploid gametophyte with gemma cups scattered about its upper surface. The gemma cups are cup-like structures containing gemmae.  The gemmae are small discs of haploid tissue, and they directly give rise to new gametophytes. They are dispersed from gemma cups by rainfall.

The gemmae are bilaterally symmetrical and are not differentiated into dorsal and ventral surfaces. The mature gemmae fall on the ground and if conditions are suitable their germination starts immediately. The surface of the gemma which comes in contact of the soil gives out many rhizoids. This surface eventually becomes the lower(ventral) surface of the thallus. Meanwhile, the apical cells present in the two lateral notches become active and form two thalli in opposite directions.

References

External links

 Marchantiales – diagrams and micrographs of liverwort gemmae

Plant morphology
Fungal morphology and anatomy
Plant reproduction